Battle of Bakhmach (Bitva u Bachmače in Czech), was one of the last battles on the 
Eastern Front in World War I between the Entente-backed Czechoslovak Legion, Soviet Russia and the Central Powers occupying Ukraine after the Treaty of Brest-Litovsk. The battle lasted from March 8 to March 13, 1918 over the city of Bakhmach (Бахмач), today in Ukraine and was the last engagement in World War 1 for the Soviets. Following a Legion victory, the Germans negotiated a truce.

Prelude 
On March 3, 1918 Russia, controlled by the Bolsheviks, signed the Brest-Litovsk peace treaty with Germany, in which it gave up control over Ukraine.

On March 8 Germans troops reached Bakhmach, an important rail hub, and in doing so threatened the Czech Legion with encirclement. The threat was so grave because captured legionnaires were summarily executed as traitors of Austria-Hungary. The 6th "Hanácký" and 7th "Tatranský" Rifle Regiments, together with the Assault battalion of Czechoslovak Army Corps of the Legion, set up defenses at the town against incoming German 91st and 224th Infantry divisions.

Battle 
The battle was notable because the troops were not only fighting for Bakhmach railway junction (victory of Stanislav Čeček), but also for the bridge over the river Desna, which led to bloody battles at Doch. The climax of the fighting occurred on March 10. Thanks to the Legion victory, the Germans negotiated a truce, during which Czechoslovak armoured trains could freely pass through Bakhmach railway junction to Chelyabinsk.

The Czechoslovak Legion (about 42,000 soldiers) during the truce set up for escape from Russia via the Trans-Siberian railroad. Armies of Germany and Austria-Hungary then started to occupy the land without much resistance.

Losses of the Legion were: 145 killed, 210 wounded, 41 missing. Estimate of German losses is around 300 dead and hundreds wounded.

Similarly to Battle of Zborov or the "Siberian anabasis", the battle of Bakhmach became one of the symbols of the Czechoslovakian Legions and their fight for independence.

Sources
 Václav Cháb: "Německý vpád na slovanský východ : kus dějin - kus boje o budoucnost", Prague, 1938
 Václav Cháb: "Bachmač : březen 1918",  Prague, 1948
 Karel Goš: "Bitva u Bachmače byla slavnou epizodou Hanáckého pluku : největší oslavy proběhly v roce 1938", article in newspaper Olomoucký den, March 20, 1999, page 10
 PRECLÍK, Vratislav. Masaryk a legie (Masaryk and legions), váz. kniha, 219 str., vydalo nakladatelství Paris Karviná, Žižkova 2379 (734 01 Karviná) ve spolupráci s Masarykovým demokratickým hnutím (Masaryk Democratic Movement, Prague), 2019, pages 50 - 70, 72 - 100, 124 - 128,140 - 148,184 - 190  
 M. Vlachynský: "V březnu 1918 bojovali legionáři u Bachmače", article in newspaper Českobudějovické listy, March 14, 1998, page 12
Adolf Kubíček: Hanáci v revoluci (Hanakians in revolution: The Chronicle of 6th Czechoslovak Rifle Regiment), Olomouc, 1928

External links

Short overviews of the battle
   
 Bachmač from Valka Municipality website 

Bakhmach
Bakhmach
Bakhmach
Bakhmach
Bakhmach
Bakhmach
March 1918 events
Bakhmach
Bakhmach
History of Chernihiv Oblast